Pierre Dubois (born 19 July 1945), is a French specialist in enchantement . He is an author, Franco-Belgian comics (bande dessinée) scriptwriter, storyteller and lecturer at the origin of renewed interest in fairies and little people in France.
He became fascinated at a young age with fairy tales and Fairytale fantasy, becoming an illustrator after a short study of Fine Arts.
He has brought together local legends and recreated them in radio and television shows for over thirty years. 
He is the inventor of elficology (elficologie) as a name for the study of the "little people" (fairies and other similar beings), although it was originally just a joke on his part. His first comic book was published in 1986. Since then he has produced one each year and also made regular appearances on television and at conferences, always in the area of fairy tales, dreams and legends related to the fairies.

Because of his encyclopedias of fairies, imps, and elves, results of twenty years of research and published in the 1990s, that Pierre Dubois won his international recognition as a French specialist in everything involving magic. These encyclopedias sold thousands of copies at a time when they were the very first works of their kind in France.

Biography

Childhood 
Pierre Dubois was born in Charleville in the Ardennes, 
then located in North Zone under the military administration of Belgium and the North. He remained "Belgian" for two years until the formation of the French Fourth Republic.

He spent part of his childhood near the Ardennes forest, where many local legends circulate; this is where he began to believe in the "spirit of place". 
His parents moved to the Nord, in Valenciennes, 
which interrupted this and gave him a "contemplative and lonely" childhood. He described this "house of the North" with a scullery beside the garden which served as a laundry room, where he imagined stories, seeking the forest that was missing. Only reading, pictures and music could calm him down. During his childhood, he sometimes returned to spend his vacation in Monthermé.

His father is an industrial designer who was very serious and often absent. He forbade reading and comic books. From when Pierre learned to read, it was to try to find the atmosphere of fantasy adventure films. Indeed, in the 1950s, his mother quietly took him to the movies on Thursdays to see Technicolor films such as Robin Hood, Tarzan, and Ivanhoe; Pierre Dubois thus "met" Errol Flynn and Liz Taylor.

For a long time comics and reading had an image of contraband for him; he read the comics that his mother bought for him in secret, like René Giffey's Buffalo Bill.

Vocation 
His style of fantasy is primarily Anglo-Saxon, after the manner of authors such as Bram Stoker, Mary Webb and Charlotte Brontë, but also of Walter Scott, Lewis Carroll and Robert Louis Stevenson.

Pierre Dubois rapidly developed a passion for legends and the little people. He began writing and drawing very early, "fascinated by image and narrative" and wishing to tell himself stories. He wanted to become a writer, but was criticized by his teachers for having "too much imagination" and writing "off topic." Pierre Dubois has described himself as a "bad pupil". As a teenager, he wanted to be a hitman and at the age of fifteen, he wanted "to be edited by Jean-Jacques Pauvert or nobody".

Pierre Dubois' interest in and talent for illustration, as well as his pronounced dislike of school, caused him to be enrolled at the Ecole des Beaux-Arts de Valenciennes, where he learned drawing and etching. While still a student, he wrote with a quill pen a manuscript on parchment covered with leather, which he succeeded in bringing to the attention of Jean-Jacques Pauvert. Upon receiving a rejection letter, he resubmitted his entire portfolio in person, decorated with illuminations, all on drawing cardboard flecked with green and black, with bookmarks of grass. Pauvert agreed to see him, but when Dubois refused to give him his only copy, the editor advised him to return in a few years.

Early career 

Pierre Dubois left his studies early to devote himself to writing and illustration. He began his career as an illustrator for magazines like Creepy and Eerie, but had difficulty finding work. It was also at this time that he began to collect local legends that were disappearing. When he was younger he had had the opportunity to read La Malvenue (The Unwelcome), a novel by Claude Seignolle. He performed his military service much later in Epernay and met the daughter of folklorist Arnold Van Gennep, who advised him to talk to Claude Seignolle. This author has a passion for fairy tales and legends and Pierre Dubois made drawings for him, which finally put his "foot in the stirrup". These meetings with Claude Seignolle and later Gilles Lapouge resulted in Pierre Dubois becoming passionate about the old crafts, popular fairy tales, folklore and the marvelous.

References 

1945 births
Living people
People from Charleville-Mézières
French fantasy writers
Writers from Hauts-de-France
Storytellers
French male writers
21st-century French non-fiction writers